A Boy and His Dog is a cycle of narratives by author Harlan Ellison. The cycle tells the story of an amoral boy (Vic) and his telepathic dog (Blood), who work together as a team to survive in the post-apocalyptic world after a nuclear war. The original 1969 novella was adapted into the 1975 film A Boy and His Dog directed by L.Q. Jones. Both the story and the film were well-received by critics and science fiction fans, but the film was not successful commercially. The original novella was followed by short stories and a graphic novel.

The film adaptation was an influence on Love and Monsters (2020) by Michael Matthews. The story and its film adaptation have also been mentioned to be influential in the creation of the Fallout video game series by Black Isle Studios.

Publication history
Ellison began the cycle with the 1969 short story of the same title, published in New Worlds, and expanded and revised the tale to novella length for his story collection The Beast that Shouted Love at the Heart of the World the same year. He subsequently bookended the original story with two others in the same world: "Eggsucker" (The Ariel Book of Fantasy Volume Two, 1977), and "Run, Spot, Run" (Amazing Stories, 1980). 

The stories were adapted as a two-issue black and white comic series illustrated by Richard Corben, Vic and Blood: The Chronicles of a Boy and His Dog (Mad Dog Graphics, 1987). The series was collected as a color graphic novel of the same name in 1989 by NBM/St. Martin’s Press, and was in turn published in French by Comics USA (Vic & Blood: Les chroniques d'un gars at son chien, 1989) and in Spanish by Norma Editorial (Vic & Blood, CEC #72, 1990). Both the graphic novel and the prose stories were collected in Vic and Blood: The Continuing Adventures of a Boy and His Dog (Edgework Abbey/iBooks, 2003). Ellison's introduction to the collection explains that 1969's A Boy and His Dog is part of a larger novel that he has been writing for over 30 years and that story is finished, but the last, longest part is written as a screenplay with no current plans for production.

Ellison suggested as late as 2003 that he would combine the three stories (possibly with additional material) to create a novel with the proposed title of Blood's a Rover (not to be confused with the Chad Oliver story or the James Ellroy novel Blood's a Rover). In January 2018, Subterranean Press announced the publication of Blood's a Rover, combining materials from the author's files, versions of the novella and short stories that have been expanded and revised, material from Corben's graphic novel, and previously unpublished material from the unproduced 1977 NBC television series Blood's a Rover.

Setting
The novella and the film adaptation have the same alternate timeline setting, diverging with the failed assassination of President John F. Kennedy. Instead of concentrating on the Space Race, technological advancements in robotics, animal intelligence, and telepathy take place. A more heated Cold War takes place, culminating in a conventional World War III. A truce is signed, lasting another 25 years, though mounting tensions lead to World War IV in 2007, this time involving massive nuclear warfare and only lasting five days. Civilization is almost entirely obliterated, leaving the surface of Earth reduced to a desolate, irradiated wasteland.

Years later, in 2024, foragers who remain above ground must fight for the remaining resources. Most survivors in the former United States are male, as women were usually in the bombed cities while many men were out fighting in the war. In the novella, nuclear fallout had created horrific mutations, such as the feared burnpit screamers, known for their noise and deadliness (in the film, they appear in only one scene, though they are only heard).

Eggsucker

Plot
Blood recalls how he met Vic in 2048, and describes him as "steadfast, responsible, and game as they come." He recounts an evening during which he and Vic go to barter scavenged items with the "82nd Airborne", the armorers for most of the local roverpacks except for that of the child-slaver "Fellini." Transported from a dock by skiff to the 82nd Airborne's boat, the pair trade wine and spent brass for fresh ammunition, and Vic is invited to stay and drink. Blood declines to drink, and is repeatedly insulted by the gang, until the goading drives him to attempt to bite one of them. The gang member knocks Blood down and points a rifle at Blood's head, and Vic immediately shoots the gang member. As Vic covers the remaining stunned gang members, Blood climbs into Vic's pack and passes out. He awakens again with them on the dock and Vic running for their lives. Upon reaching safety, Vic unceremoniously dumps Blood onto the ground and storms off in anger at having lost access to "the only armorer in the territory." Blood initially lets him go, but thinks better of it after considering the alternatives, and saves Vic from walking into a crater in the road containing a "Screamer" (a green corpse-like mutant). The pair run miles up the road, and having reconciled, sit down to eat.

A Boy and His Dog

Plot
Vic, aged 15, was born in and scavenges throughout the wasteland of the former southwestern United States as a "solo" (as opposed to a member of a "roverpack" gang). Vic is most concerned with food and sex. Having lost both of his parents, he has no formal education and does not understand ethics or morality. He is accompanied by a well-read, misanthropic, telepathic dog named Blood, who helps him locate women, in return for food. Blood cannot forage for himself, due to the same genetic engineering that granted him telepathy. The two steal for a living, evading "roverpacks" (gangs) and mutants. Blood and Vic have an occasionally antagonistic relationship, though they realize that they need each other.

At a movie house, Blood claims to smell a woman, and the pair track her to an abandoned YMCA building. There, they meet Quilla June Holmes, a teenaged girl from "Downunder", a society located in a large underground nuclear vault. Before Vic can rape her, Blood informs the pair that a roverpack has tracked them to the building and they have to fight them off. After killing a number of them, the trio hides in a boiler and set the structure on fire.  

Vic finally has sex with Quilla June, and though she protests at first, she begins to come on to him. Blood takes an instant disliking to her, but Vic ignores him. Vic and Quilla June have sex repeatedly but eventually she attacks him and takes off to return to her underground community. Vic, furious at her deception, follows her, despite Blood's warnings. Blood remains at the portal on the surface.

Downunder has an artificial biosphere complete with forests and underground cities. One, named Topeka after the ruins of the city it lies beneath, is fashioned in a surreal mockery of 1950s rural innocence. Vic is captured by the ruling council (the Better Business Bureau). They confess that Quilla June was sent to the surface in order to lure a man to Downunder. The population of Topeka is becoming sterile, and the babies that are born are usually female. They feel that Vic, despite his crudeness and savage behavior, will be able to reinvigorate that male population. Vic is first elated to learn that he is to impregnate the female population, but he quickly grows jaded of his surroundings and plots his escape.

Quilla June is reunited with Vic and they plan to escape together. Vic uses the fact that Quilla June's father secretly desires sex with her as a distraction, incapacitating him so that they can escape.

On the surface, Vic and Quilla June discover that Blood is starving and near death, having been attacked by radioactive insects and other "things". Quilla June tries to get Vic to leave Blood and take off with her. Knowing he will never survive without Blood's guidance and, more importantly, that Blood will not survive without care and food, Vic faces a difficult situation. It is implied that he kills his new love and cooks her flesh to save Blood's life. The novella ends with Vic remembering her question as Blood eats: "Do you know what love is?" and he concludes, "Sure I know. A boy loves his dog."

Reception
The novella won the Nebula Award for Best Novella upon its release in 1969 and was also nominated for the 1970 Hugo Award for Best Novella.

Film adaptation

The 1975 science fiction film directed by L.Q. Jones was controversial for alleged misogyny; the script included lines that were not in Ellison's original stories and that authors such as Joanna Russ found to be objectionable. The film's final line is from Blood: "Well, I'd say she certainly had marvelous judgement, Albert, if not particularly good taste." Ellison disavowed this addition as a "moronic, hateful chauvinist last line, which I despise." Ellison did, however, accept that the ending remained popular with fans, saying: "I would have kept the original last line from the original story, which I think is much more human and beguiling than the sort of punchline that L.Q. Jones used. But L.Q. knew what he was doing in terms of the market, I suppose." On the other hand, Harlan also loved the movie (as stated in an interview conversation with L.Q. Jones on the Shout Factory Blu Ray); after Jones screened it to him, he said it was exactly what the story was supposed to be on screen. It was a few days after he brought up his problems, mostly concerning the way Blood talked about the girl during the locker room scene when they first meet.

Run, Spot, Run

Plot
Although Blood is now back on his feet and travelling west, the pair's situation deteriorates as the guilt-ridden Vic begins having hallucinations of a ghostly Quilla June, which Blood also experiences through their telepathic link. Due to his preoccupation, Vic stumbles into an encounter with a roving gang of child soldiers and slaves led by the adult "Fellini", and badly breaks his ankle while attempting to escape. At Blood's suggestion, Vic climbs into a hollow tree stump to hide, and Blood covers him with leaves and dirt before going to hide himself. Hours later, with the gang gone, Blood returns to find the stump surrounded by giant spiders. Driving them off, Blood finds Vic in a hopeless, almost catatonic state, and despite Blood's appeals, Vic allows himself to be cocooned by one of the spiders. Blood runs off as the spider finishes and begins to look for new prey, and he continues west, now haunted by the ghost of Vic rather than Quilla June.

Production
The reasons given by Ellison for this abrupt ending have differed over the years. One relates to his anger over the L.Q. Jones ending of the film, as detailed above. The other is, according to Ellison, essentially a desire to stop his fans from requesting more stories about the two characters. Ellison claimed at the time of the film's release that he had said all he wanted to say about Vic and Blood, and that there would be no more sequels.

Blood's A Rover

A publication of a sequel novel, Blood's A Rover, was announced by Ace Books in the early 1980s; while Ellison spent the advance, he never delivered a manuscript, and the publication was canceled (Ace agreed to settle for republishing 13 of Ellison's books. In the introduction to Vic and Blood, dated 25 March 2003, Ellison claimed to have finished it, but that "the final, longest section is in screenplay form—and they're bidding here in Hollywood, once again, for the feature film and tv rights—and one of these days before I go through that final door, I'll translate it into elegant prose, and the full novel will appear"

References

1969 short stories
Alternate history short stories
Cannibalism in fiction
Cold War fiction
Fiction about telepathy
Fiction set in 2024
Nebula Award for Best Novella-winning works
Novels set during World War III
Fiction about nuclear war and weapons
American post-apocalyptic fiction
Short stories by Harlan Ellison
Short stories set in the United States